William Victor Roth Jr. (July 22, 1921 – December 13, 2003) was an American lawyer and politician from Wilmington, Delaware. He was a veteran of World War II and a member of the Republican Party. He served from 1967 to 1970 as the lone U.S. Representative from Delaware and from 1971 to 2001 as a U.S. Senator from Delaware. He is the most recent Republican to have served as a U.S. Senator from Delaware.

Roth was a sponsor of legislation creating the Roth IRA, an individual retirement plan that can be set up with post-tax dollars, offering tax-free withdrawals.

Early life and family
Roth was born in Great Falls, Montana, the son of Clara (née Nelson) and William Victor Roth, who ran a brewery. His paternal grandparents were German and his maternal grandparents were Swedish. He attended public schools in Helena, Montana, graduating from Helena High School. Roth started college at Montana State University before moving on to graduate from the University of Oregon in 1943, Harvard Business School in 1947, and Harvard Law School in 1949. During World War II he served in a United States Army intelligence unit from 1943 until 1946.

After being admitted to the California Bar in 1950, he moved permanently to Delaware in 1954, and began his work as an attorney for the Hercules Corporation. He married Jane Richards in 1965 and they had two children, William III and Katharine. Jane Richards Roth is also a lawyer. She was U.S. District Court judge, for the District of Delaware from 1985 until 1991 and since was a judge of the U.S. Court of Appeals for the Third Circuit. They were members of the Episcopal Church.

Professional and political career

After losing the election for Lieutenant Governor of Delaware in 1960, Roth was chair of the Delaware Republican Party until 1964. In 1966, he defeated incumbent U.S. Representative Harris McDowell, and went on to serve two terms in the United States House of Representatives from January 3, 1967, until December 31, 1970. Roth voted in favor of the Civil Rights Act of 1968.

He then began his five terms in the United States Senate, succeeding the retiring incumbent senator John J. Williams. He served in the U.S. Senate from January 1, 1971, having been appointed when Williams left office two days early, until January 3, 2001, having been defeated in the 2000 election by the Democratic candidate, Governor Tom Carper. Many consider Roth's defeat due to his age and health, as he collapsed twice during the campaign, once in the middle of a television interview and once during a campaign event.

Roth was known for fiscal conservatism. Critics blamed him for national deficits during the presidency of Ronald Reagan. He was a longtime member of the Senate Committee on Governmental Affairs and the Senate Committee on Finance, serving as Chairman from September 12, 1995 through January 3, 2001. He was best remembered as a strong advocate of tax cuts, and he co-authored the Economic Recovery Tax Act of 1981, also known as the Kemp-Roth Tax Cut with Jack Kemp. Roth was also the legislative sponsor of the individual retirement account plan that bears his name, the Roth IRA. It is a popular individual retirement account that has existed since 1998. The Roth 401(k), which did not become available until 2006, is also named after Roth. He was also one of the few Republicans to vote for the Brady Bill and the ban on semi-automatic weapons. Roth strongly supported environmental protections.  Roth was also very engaged in international affairs and policy.  He served as the President of NATO's parliament, the North Atlantic Assembly, from 1996 to 1998.

In 1977, Roth was one of nine senators to vote against the Senate adopting a stringent code of ethics intended to assist with the restoration of public confidence in Congress.

On December 2, 1981, Roth was one of four senators to vote against an amendment to President Reagan's MX missiles proposal that would divert the silo system by $334 million as well as earmark further research for other methods that would allow giant missiles to be based. The vote was seen as a rebuff of the Reagan administration.

Roth voted in favor of the bill establishing Martin Luther King Jr. Day as a federal holiday and the Civil Rights Restoration Act of 1987 (as well to override President Reagan's veto). Roth voted in favor of the nominations of Robert Bork and Clarence Thomas to the U.S. Supreme Court.

During the 1999 impeachment of Bill Clinton Roth voted to convict the President on both charges of impeachment. However Clinton was acquitted on both charges.

Roth was a witty man but not a natural campaigner. To help himself, he would ease himself into public appearances by bringing along a Saint Bernard dog. His succession of St. Bernards through his 34-year political career became a trademark of sorts.

Death
Roth died in Washington, D.C., of heart failure on December 13, 2003, at the age of 82. The Chesapeake & Delaware Canal Bridge carrying Delaware Route 1 was dedicated as the Senator William V. Roth Jr. Bridge, and a celebration was held on July 9, 2007. The bridge is a cable-stayed bridge and notable landmark in northern Delaware. Roth helped secure its funding.

Electoral history

Works

References

Other sources

External links
Biographical Directory of the United States Congress 
U.S. Senator William V. Roth, Jr. home page (archived from December 2000)

|-

|-

|-

|-

|-

1921 births
2003 deaths
20th-century American politicians
American people of German descent
American people of Swedish descent
People from Wilmington, Delaware
United States Army personnel of World War II
Military personnel from Delaware
Military personnel from Montana
United States Army soldiers
University of Oregon alumni
Harvard Business School alumni
Harvard Law School alumni
Delaware lawyers
Republican Party United States senators from Delaware
Republican Party members of the United States House of Representatives from Delaware
20th-century American lawyers
20th-century American Episcopalians